

The 2002 NHL Entry Draft was the 40th NHL Entry Draft. It was held on June 22 and 23, 2002 at the Air Canada Centre in Toronto, Ontario. Two hundred and ninety-one players were drafted in total: 35 from the Ontario Hockey League (OHL); 23 from the Quebec Major Junior Hockey League (QMJHL); 43 from the Western Hockey League (WHL); 41 from the National Collegiate Athletic Association (NCAA) hockey conferences; six from U.S. high schools and 110 from outside North America.

The last active player in the NHL from this draft class was Duncan Keith, who played his last NHL game in the 2021–22 NHL season.

Final central scouting rankings

Skaters

Goaltenders

Selections by round

Round one

Round two

Round three

Round four

Round five

Round six

Round seven

Round eight

Round nine

Draftees based on nationality

See also
 2002–03 NHL season
 List of NHL first overall draft choices
 List of NHL players

References

External links 
 prosportstransactions.com: 2002 NHL Entry Draft Pick Transactions
 USAToday.com: Trades involving 2002 NHL Entry Draft picks
 2002 NHL Draft list and stats at Hockey-Reference
 2002 NHL Entry Draft player stats at The Internet Hockey Database

Draft
National Hockey League Entry Draft